{{DISPLAYTITLE:C21H34O2}}
The molecular formula C21H34O2 (molar mass : 318.49 g/mol, exact mass : 318.25588) may refer to:

 Allopregnanolone, a neurosteroid
 Bilobol, an alkylresorcinol found in Ginkgo biloba fruits
 BSPP, a drug
 CP 47,497, an agonist of cannabinoid receptor
 Epipregnanolone
 Isopregnanolone
 Methasterone, an anabolic steroid
 Pregnanolone, a neurosteroid